KRHP may refer to:

 KRHP-LD, a defunct low-power television station (channel 14) formerly licensed to serve The Dalles, Oregon, United States
 Western Carolina Regional Airport (ICAO code KRHP)